The 1947–48 Yugoslav Ice Hockey League season was the seventh season of the Yugoslav Ice Hockey League, the top level of ice hockey in Yugoslavia. Six teams participated in the league, and Partizan have won the championship.

Regular season

Group A

Group B

References

External links
Yugoslav Ice Hockey League seasons

Yugo
Yugoslav Ice Hockey League seasons
1947–48 in Yugoslav ice hockey